, married name  is a former Japanese singer. She was originally member number 12 of Onyanko Club.

History

Biography
Kawai was born and raised in Chita, Aichi. She first entered the entertainment business in 1983 after winning second place in CBS Sony's Teens Pop Contest. However, her activities with the label were few, and after graduating high school, she continued her studies at a computer-oriented vocational school.

In 1985, she auditioned for Onyanko Club in their show , and was chosen to be a part of the group. She made her solo debut the same year, with the single "Namida no Jasmine LOVE", making her the first Onyanko Club member to launch a solo career. Her first album followed a few months later. In 1986, she released "Aoi Stasion", which stayed at the No. 1 place on the Oricon charts for two consecutive weeks, making it Kawai's signature song. In April, she graduated from Onyanko Club at the Nippon Budōkan venue of their first concert tour and officially became a solo artist. She would later become one of the hosts of Yūyake Nyan Nyan's sister show, .

In 1988, she decided to stop making television appearances, opting to promote her newest material on the radio or live events instead. She also started to work with a varied lineup of producers, showing more maturity in her work, which culminated in her composing four songs on her album Dancin' In The Light, released the following year.  In 1990, she released what would be her final album, Replica, in which all the tracks were composed by Kawai herself. After the promotional tour for the album, she announced the dissolution of her fanclub and her temporary retirement from music.  After a long absence from the media after her marriage, in the year 2000 she appeared on a single scene of an episode of the television drama . Ten years later, in 2010, she teamed up with fellow 80s idols Yōko Oginome, Hidemi Ishikawa (石川秀美, ishikawa Hidemi) and Tsukasa Itō (伊藤つかさ, Itō Tsukasa) for a promotional campaign for the cosmetics brand Shiseido.

Personal life
In 1994, she married Tsugutoshi Gotō, who had composed a big part of her songs. She adopted his surname, though she still uses Kawai as her artist name. In a press conference in 2010, it was revealed that she and Gotō have a child.

Discography

Singles

Studio albums
 Sonoko (1985)
  (1986)
 Mode de Sonoko (1986)
 Rouge et Bleu (1987)
 Colors (1988)
 Dancin' In The Light]] (1989)
 Replica (1990)

Compilation albums
 Dedication (1988)
 sonnet (1990)
  (1997)
  (2002)
  (2009)

Video releases
  (1985, VHS) (2004, DVD)
  (1987, VHS)
  (1987, VHS) (2004, DVD)
 JESSY (1988, CD video)
 Sweet Contrast (1989, VHS)
  (2007, DVD)

Television appearances

Dramas
 Sukeban Deka (1985)
  (1985–1986)
 : "Tōmei Shōjo" (1986)
 Hatachi no Matsuri (1986)
 Getsuyō Drama Land: "Miyuki" (1986)
  (1987)

Variety shows
  (1985–1986)
  (1986)

References

External links
  Sony Music Japan page

Onyanko Club
1965 births
Japanese women singers
Japanese idols
Japanese television actresses
Living people
People from Chita, Aichi
Musicians from Aichi Prefecture